Destination New Zealand is a tourism television program that features major tourism locations in New Zealand. The program is produced by Tourism Network, who work with Tourism New Zealand to promote tourists to travel and explore New Zealand.

About the program
There are 14 episodes of Destination New Zealand, which takes viewers to:

Northland
Auckland
Coromandel
Rotorua
Gisborne
Hawkes Bay

Wellington
Nelson
Marlborough
Canterbury
West Coast
Queenstown

Destination New Zealand is hosted by New Zealand actress Miriama Smith and shows regional attractions including vineyards, accommodation, food, excursions and adventures.

International Broadcasters

References

External links
Official Website
New Zealand tourism site

New Zealand documentary television series
2000s New Zealand television series
Tourism in New Zealand